Pearl River High School (PRHS) is a public high school in Pearl River, Rockland County, New York, United States. It is part of the Pearl River School District.

Awards 
 2001 Malcolm Baldrige National Quality Award
2020 Niche.com COVID-19 Pandemic Safety Award

Notable alumni 
 Kevin Houston, basketball player
 Dan Fortmann, football player
 Christopher Carley, actor
 Corinna Lin, figure skater
 Robert Clohessy, actor
 Paul Teutul Sr., motorcycle designer

References

External links 
 

Schools in Rockland County, New York
Public high schools in New York (state)